Raphaël Parisella (born 23 October 2002) is a Canadian cyclist, who currently rides for French amateur team Dinan Sport Cycling.

Major results
2019
 1st  Road race, National Junior Road Championships

References

External links

2002 births
Living people
Canadian male cyclists
Cyclists from Quebec
Sportspeople from Longueuil
21st-century Canadian people